Relizane Airport  is a civilian airport in Algeria, located  west-northwest of Zemmora (Relizane); about  west-southwest of Algiers.   It is used by general aviation, with no scheduled commercial air service.

World War II
During World War II, it was a major Twelfth Air Force base of operations during the North African Campaign against the German Afrika Korps, used by the 60th Troop Carrier Group, flying C-47 Skytrain aircraft from the field between 27 November 1942 and May 1943.

References

 Maurer, Maurer. Air Force Combat Units of World War II. Maxwell AFB, Alabama: Office of Air Force History, 1983. .

External links

OurAirports - Relizane

Airports in Algeria
Airfields of the United States Army Air Forces in Algeria
World War II airfields in Algeria
Buildings and structures in Relizane Province